Sierra McCormick (born October 28, 1997) is an American actress. She first became known for participating on the game show Are You Smarter Than a 5th Grader? (2007–2008) before making her acting debut with a recurring role as Lilith on the television series Supernatural (2008). She also starred as Scout Thomas on the comedy television series Romantically Challenged (2010), played Alice in the direct-to-DVD film Spooky Buddies (2011), for which she won a Young Artist Award, and received recognition for her role as Susan Kushner in the comedy film Ramona and Beezus (2010).

McCormick had her breakthrough starring as Olive Doyle on the Disney Channel series A.N.T. Farm (2011–2014). She has since transitioned to more mature film roles, receiving praise for starring as Moira in the horror indie film Some Kind of Hate (2015) and earning critical acclaim for her roles as Fay Crocker in the science fiction film The Vast of Night (2019), which earned her a nomination from the Critics' Choice Super Awards, and as Melissa in the horror film We Need to Do Something (2021). She returned to television playing Scarlett in three episodes of the Hulu series American Horror Stories (2021).

Early life
McCormick was born on October 28, 1997 in Asheville, North Carolina. She moved to Los Angeles, California, in 2006, after expressing an interest in acting.

Career

2007–2014: Child acting and breakthrough 
McCormick first began acting in 2007 at the age of nine, making an uncredited cameo on the television series 'Til Death. In 2007, she was cast in the second season of the game show Are You Smarter Than a 5th Grader? as one of the students. Following a guest appearance on the Disney Channel series Hannah Montana in 2008, she co-starred with China Anne McClain in the film Jack and Janet Save the Planet, an unaired pilot. In the same year, she appeared as Lilith on two episodes of the fantasy television series Supernatural. In 2010, McCormick starred in the comedy film Ramona and Beezus as Susan Kushner, the rival of the title character, Ramona Quimby. The film was received positively, with the acting ensemble being praised for their performances. In the same year, she was cast as Scout Thomas, the daughter of Rebecca Thomas, in the comedy television series Romantically Challenged, which was cancelled after a season.

In 2011, she appeared in the television film A Nanny for Christmas. In the same year, she voiced Alice in the Disney direct-to-video film Spooky Buddies. McCormick, along with the cast of the film, won a Young Artist Award for their performances. Also in 2011, McCormick had her breakthrough when she was cast in the role of Olive Doyle, a girl with an eidetic memory, in the Disney Channel series A.N.T. Farm. She was chosen after an audition where she continuously spoke about tigers. Dan Signer stated: "And as I heard her continually talking about tigers, I thought, 'That's just how Olive would sound.' Which is how Sierra got that part." According to an interview with McCormick, getting the role was easy because she and McClain were already friends from their previous work experience. The show ran for three seasons, ending in 2014. From 2011 to 2014, McCormick had a recurring role on the Disney Channel sitcom Jessie as Connie, a girl obsessed with one of the main characters, Luke.

2015–present: Transition to mainstream roles 
In 2015, McCormick starred in the horror film Some Kind of Hate as Moira. She had been hired by director Adam Egypt Mortimer to appeal to her then younger fanbase, stating that the film would be "the first intense horror movie experience that some of these kids will ever have". Although the film received mixed reviews, McCormick’s performance, along with the rest of her cast members was received positively, with Bloody Disgusting writing "The acting is largely well done, and the script by Mortimer and DeLeeuw definitely attempt to give the characters more dimension than what you’d normally expect from a film like this." McCormick earned a Fright Meter Award nomination for the role. From 2016 to 2018, McCormick worked in a series of short films and television films; these include her roles as Sarah in the 2016 Lifetime television film Sorority Nightmare, and as Kara Gentry in the 2017 film Christmas in the Heartland, which was originally made for television, but was later released direct-to-video.

In 2019, McCormick co-starred with Jake Horowitz in the science fiction film The Vast of Night, based on the Kecksburg UFO incident and the Foss Lake Disappearances. She starred as Fay Crocker, a young switchboard operator in high school in the fictional town of Cayuga, New Mexico. McCormick said that she was convinced to play the role after reading the script, where she then met with the film's director Andrew Patterson and auditioned. To prepare for the role, she had to learn how to use a switchboard, which she practiced in her hotel room. The film and McCormick's performance were acclaimed, with critics particularly praising her consistency in long single takes. Paste included her among the "10 Breakout Film Performances of the Year", additionally writing that "Sierra McCormick does some work in The Vast of Night that’s competitive with the best acting of the year." Salon also listed her performance as one of "6 great film performances missed in 2020", comparing her to a "young Sissy Spacek." For her role, she received a special mention from the Jury Awards at the Hamptons International Film Festival, as well as a nomination for Best Actress in a Science Fiction/Fantasy Movie at the Critics' Choice Super Awards.

McCormick next appeared in the 2019 horror film VFW, where she portrayed Lizard. She commented on her experience with the role, stating "I was really excited to do something different. People got to see me being really crass and bloody and kicking some ass..." She also starred in the Lifetime television film Who Stole My Daughter? as Katie Sullivan, the eponymous daughter of Samaire Armstrong's character.  In October 2020, it was announced McCormick would star alongside Vinessa Shaw in the upcoming thriller film We Need to Do Something; she was cast as Melissa, who is part of a family trapped in their bathroom during a tornado. She stated that "I felt really antsy being cooped up in my apartment, and I’m sure everyone can relate to that feeling ... when I read the script, I was struck by the nihilistic tone the movie takes, and I’m a big fan of that." The film was theatrically released in September 2021, and earned generally positive reviews from critics. McCormick's performance was lauded, with Chicago Reader describing her as "captivating". IGN wrote that "Sierra McCormick brings wide eyes and a sulking snarl to teen daughter Melissa, whose internal drama is signaled by a goth wardrobe topped by a bubblegum pink wig."

From July to August 2021, McCormick appeared in three episodes of American Horror Stories on FX on Hulu. Her role as Scarlett was praised; CBR described her as having a "captivating screen presence", and went on to state that she made "a strong debut ... it’d be seriously surprising if she doesn’t eventually get cast in some of Murphy’s other projects. She’s set to be a star." She will headline the coming-of-age drama film Sour Milk.

Filmography

Film

Television

Music videos 
 "Dynamite" (2011), by China Anne McClain

Awards and nominations

References

External links
 
 

1997 births
21st-century American actresses
Actresses from North Carolina
American child actresses
American film actresses
American television actresses
Living people
People from Asheville, North Carolina